The 1990–91 Segunda Divisão season was the 57th season of the competition and the 41st season of recognised third-tier football in Portugal.

Overview
The league was contested by 60 teams in 3 divisions with AD Ovarense, Rio Ave FC and SC Olhanense winning the respective divisional competitions and gaining promotion to the Liga de Honra.  The overall championship was won by AD Ovarense.

League standings

Segunda Divisão - Zona Norte

Segunda Divisão - Zona Centro

Segunda Divisão - Zona Sul

Championship play-off

References

External links
 Portuguese Division Two «B» - footballzz.co.uk

Portuguese Third Division seasons
Port
3